Rudi Mathee (born 25 February 1986) is a former South African rugby union footballer that played mainly as a lock. He most recently represented the Pumas in the Currie Cup and Vodacom Cup having previously played for the Golden Lions, Leopards, Cheetahs and Griffons.

He was a member of the Pumas side that won the Vodacom Cup for the first time in 2015, beating  24–7 in the final. Mathee made nine appearances during the season, scoring three tries.

He retired in 2016 on medical advice after suffering a back injury.

References

External links

itsrugby.co.uk profile

Living people
1986 births
South African rugby union players
Rugby union locks
Rugby union players from Port Elizabeth
Pumas (Currie Cup) players
Golden Lions players
Leopards (rugby union) players
Free State Cheetahs players
Griffons (rugby union) players
Lions (United Rugby Championship) players